Mordecai Suchostaver (1790 – 29 July 1880) was a Galician adherent of the Haskalah, and teacher of philosophy at the rabbinical seminary of Zhitomir. He was a student of Nachman Krochmal and Menachem Mendel Levin.

Biography
Mordecai Suchostaver was born in 1790 near Brody, Galicia. He left Brody for Odessa, where, in the early 1830s, he was appointed private secretary and tutor in the household of Joseph Günzburg, settling in Kamenetz-Podolsk. Upon the opening of the rabbinical seminary at Zhitomir, Suchostaver was called to that city. He remained until the institution was closed in 1873. Among his students at the seminary were Abraham Jacob Paperna and Hirtz Gintzburg.

Influenced by the school of the Haskalah, Suchostaver wrote a philosophical introduction to Maimonides' Moreh nevukhim, which was published at Zolkiev in 1829.

He died in Zhitomir on 29 July 1880.

References
 

1790 births
1880 deaths
Educators from the Russian Empire
Jewish educators
Writers from the Russian Empire
Jews from Galicia (Eastern Europe)
People from Brody
Writers from Zhytomyr
People of the Haskalah